Saint Adrian (died 308) travelled from Batanea to Caesarea Palaestina, where he was martyred together with Saint Eubulus. He is commemorated on 5 March; Eubulus on 7 March.

Legend
Eubulus had traveled with Adrian of Batanea to visit and minister to the Christian congregation in Caesarea. Upon arrival at the gates they were asked their purpose and told the truth, for which they were immediately imprisoned by the guards, under the orders of Governor Firmilian, who had them tortured.

On 5 March, Adrian was thrown to a lion in the Amphitheatre. The lion mauled but did not kill him. Adrian was then dispatched with a sword. Two days later the judge who condemned Eubulus to the same fate offered him the opportunity to go free if he sacrificed to an idol. Eubulus refused, and was martyred, meeting the same fate.

They would be the last of many martyrs killed during the 12 years of persecutions in Caesarea.

Others named Eubulus
Another Greek Christian Eubulus receives passing mention in the Second Epistle to Timothy, one of the three "pastoral epistles" traditionally attributed to Paul of Tarsus. Other notable Greeks bearing the same name are noted at Eubulus.

References

Further reading
 John Dawson Gilmary Shea. “Saints Adrian and Eubulus, Martyrs”. Pictorial Lives of the Saints, 1889

308 deaths
4th-century Christian martyrs
4th-century Romans
Year of birth unknown